DeLisha Lachell Milton-Jones (born September 11, 1974) is an American retired professional basketball player and head coach of Old Dominion. Milton-Jones played college basketball for the University of Florida. She was a first-team All-American and SEC Player of the Year her senior season.

Milton-Jones began her professional career in 1997 with the Portland Power, who drafted her second overall in the American Basketball League (ABL). After the dissolution of the ABL in 1998, Milton-Jones entered into the 1999 WNBA Draft and was selected fourth overall by the Los Angeles Sparks. In her seventeen-season WNBA career, she has played for the Los Angeles Sparks (1999–2004, 2008–2012), the Washington Mystics (2005–07), the San Antonio Stars (2013), and the New York Liberty (2013–14).

Milton-Jones is a two-time Olympic gold medalist (2000, 2008) and a two-time WNBA champion (2001, 2002) and has been selected to the WNBA All-Star Game three times (2000, 2004, 2007).

Early years 
Milton-Jones was born DeLisha Lachell Milton in Riceboro, Georgia in 1974. She attended Bradwell Institute in Hinesville, Georgia, where she played high school basketball for the Bradwell Tigers.  Milton-Jones graduated from Bradwell in 1993.

College career 
Milton-Jones accepted an athletic scholarship to attend the University of Florida in Gainesville, Florida, where she played for coach Carol Ross's Florida Gators women's basketball team from 1993 to 1997.  She was a four-year letterman, and led the Lady Gators to four consecutive NCAA Tournament appearances.  As a senior in 1996–97, she was recognized as an All-American by the Associated Press, Kodak and the Basketball Times; she was also the winner of the Wade Trophy and the Honda Sports Award for basketball, recognizing the best women's basketball player in NCAA Division I.

Milton-Jones was inducted into the University of Florida Athletic Hall of Fame as a "Gator Great" in 2007.

Florida statistics

USA Basketball

Milton-Jones represented the US at the 1997 World University Games held in Marsala, Sicily, Italy in August 1997. The USA team won all six games, earning the gold medal at the event. Milton-Jones averaged 10.3 points per game and recorded 14 steals, second highest on the team.

Milton-Jones was named to the U.S. national team in 1998. The national team traveled to Berlin, Germany in July and August 1998 for the FIBA World Championships. The U.S. team won a close opening game against Japan 95–89, then won their next six games easily. In the semifinal game against Brazil, the U.S. team was behind as much as ten points in the first half, but the U.S. team went on to win 93–79. The gold medal game was a rematch against Russia. In the first game, the Americans dominated almost from the beginning, but in the rematch, the Russian team took the early lead and led much of the way. With under two minutes remaining, the U.S. team was down by two points but the Americans responded, then held on to win the gold medal 71–65. Milton-Jones averaged 7.1 points per game.

Milton-Jones is well known for the unusual length of her arms, which give her an eighty-four inch wingspan—typical of that of a seven-foot person.  She was a member of the U.S. national women's basketball teams that won the gold medal at the 2000 Summer Olympics in Sydney, Australia and the 2008 Summer Olympics in Beijing, China, as well as the U.S. women's teams that won world championships in 1998 and 2002.

Professional career

ABL
Milton-Jones was drafted second overall by the Portland Power in the 1997 American Basketball League (ABL) Draft. During her rookie season, Milton-Jones played in all 44 games and started in 35 of them. She averaged 28.1 minutes per game, 8.5 points, 2.3 assists, 1.5 steals and 4.9 rebounds. The ABL folded in December 1998. The Power played 13 games, all of which Milton-Jones started. She averaged 29.2 minutes per game, 11.9 points, 2.0 assists, 2.4 steals and 9.8 rebounds.

WNBA
In 1999, Milton-Jones was drafted 4th overall by the Los Angeles Sparks. She would play the first six years of her career with the Sparks from 1999 to 2004, playing alongside Lisa Leslie. During her six-year tenure with the Sparks, Milton-Jones won two WNBA championships in 2001 and 2002.

In 2005, she was traded to the Washington Mystics in exchange for Chamique Holdsclaw and a first-round draft pick in the 2004 off-season.

On April 22, 2008, Milton-Jones was reacquired by the Los Angeles Sparks in a trade for Taj McWilliams-Franklin.

In 2013, she signed with the San Antonio Silver Stars before being released and then signed by the New York Liberty. On July 9, 2014, Milton-Jones was traded to the Atlanta Dream in exchange for Swin Cash

In August 2015, Milton-Jones played in her 497th WNBA game, a then league-record for most WNBA games played (since been broken by Sue Bird).

In 2016, Milton-Jones was released by the Dream.

In September 2016, Miton-Jones officially announced her retirement.

Overseas
In 2003, she won the Euroleague Championship with team Ekaterinburg in Russia. In the 2005–06 season, she won the Euroleague with Gambrinus Brno of the Czech Republic and for the season 2006–07 she signed a two-year contract with Ros Casares Valencia of Spain.  During the 2008–2009 WNBA off-season, Milton-Jones played for Ros Casares Valencia in Spain. for whom she also played during the 2007-08 off-season.

Coaching career
She became the second woman (after Ashley McElhiney) to coach a men's professional basketball team when, in 2005, she took over the ABA's Los Angeles Stars.

On March 29, 2017, she was named the head coach of Pepperdine Waves women's basketball replacing Ryan Weisenberg. In 2019, Milton-Jones resigned from Pepperdine to become an assistant at Syracuse. On April 17, 2020, she was named head coach at Old Dominion University.

Head coaching record

Personal life
Milton-Jones appeared in the 2000 movie Love and Basketball as Delisha Milton.  In 2003, Milton-Jones married Roland Jones.

Europe 

 2001-2002: Lavezzini Basket Parma (Italy)
 2002-2004: UMMC Ekaterinburg (Russia)
 2007-2009: Ros Casares Valencia (Spain)

Awards and honors 

Milton-Jones has received numerous awards and honors, some of which are listed below.

WNBA
2015 Kim Perrot Sportsmanship Award

Gold Medals 

2000 & 2008 Olympic Games
2007 Tournament of Americas
1998 & 2002 FIBA World Championship
2002 Opals World Challenge
1999 U.S. Olympic Cup
1997 World University Games
1994 U.S. Olympic Festival

Bronze Medal 

2006 FIBA World Championship

Collegiate honors 

1997 SEC Player of the Year
1997 State Farm Wade Trophy
1997 First-team All-American
1997 First-team All-Southeastern Conference
1996 First-team All-Southeastern Conference
1995 Second-team All-Southeastern Conference
1994 Southeastern Conference All-Freshman team
SEC Player of the Week (February 27, 1995; December 15, 1996; January 5, 1997; January 26, 1997)

WNBA career statistics

Regular season 

|-
| align="left" | 1999
| align="left" | Los Angeles
| 32 || 32 || 26.1 || .530 || .000 || .791 || 5.5 || 1.6 || 1.5 || 0.5 || 2.2 || 9.9
|-
| align="left" | 2000
| align="left" | Los Angeles
| 32 || 32 || 30.7 || .512 || .250 || .745 || 6.1 || 2.1 || 1.4 || 0.9 || 2.0 || 11.8
|-
|style="text-align:left;background:#afe6ba;"| 2001†
| align="left" | Los Angeles
| 32 || 27 || 29.3 || .453 || .343 || .794 || 5.3 || 2.1 || 1.5 || 0.9 || 1.8 || 10.3
|-
|style="text-align:left;background:#afe6ba;"| 2002†
| align="left" | Los Angeles
| 32 || 25 || 30.2 || .487 || .420 || .740 || 6.6 || 1.4 || 1.6 || 1.1 || 2.9 || 11.3
|-
| align="left" | 2003
| align="left" | Los Angeles
| 31 || 30 || 35.0 || .424 || .377 || .804 || 7.1 || 2.1 || 1.6 || 1.3 || 2.5 || 13.4
|-
| align="left" | 2004
| align="left" | Los Angeles
| 19 || 19 || 31.8 || .404 || .297 || .726 || 4.7 || 1.6 || 1.2 || 0.5 || 2.5 || 9.8
|-
| align="left" | 2005
| align="left" | Washington
| 33 || 30 || 32.4 || .417 || .328 || .798 || 5.2 || 1.8 || 1.7 || 0.5 || 2.2 || 11.9
|-
| align="left" | 2006
| align="left" | Washington
| 23 || 20 || 29.3 || .472 || .430 || .810 || 4.9 || 2.1 || 1.5 || 0.7 || 2.9 || 14.6
|-
| align="left" | 2007
| align="left" | Washington
| 34 || 34 || 33.6 || .349 || .235 || .845 || 6.4 || 1.6 || 1.5 || 1.1 || 3.5 || 13.4
|-
| align="left" | 2008
| align="left" | Los Angeles
| 31 || 31 || 32.8 || .480 || .358 || .774 || 6.3 || 2.4 || 1.1 || 0.6 || 3.0 || 13.9
|-
| align="left" | 2009
| align="left" | Los Angeles
| 33 || 33 || 31.6 || .401 || .293 || .757 || 4.8 || 2.2 || 1.2 || 0.2 || 2.2 || 10.2
|-
| align="left" | 2010
| align="left" | Los Angeles
| 34 || 34 || 32.2 || .470 || .317 || .866 || 4.7 || 2.5 || 1.1 || 0.6 || 2.8 || 15.4
|-
| align="left" | 2011
| align="left" | Los Angeles
| 34 || 34 || 26.2 || .462 || .352 || .831 || 4.6 || 2.0 || 0.9 || 0.4 || 2.4 || 11.7
|-
| align="left" | 2012
| align="left" | Los Angeles
| 34 || 34 || 27.2 || .417 || .326 || .823 || 4.2 || 1.8 || 1.0 || 0.7 || 1.8 || 10.0
|-
| align="left" | 2013
| align="left" | San Antonio*
| 15 || 15 || 27.3 || .421 || .214 || .607 || 4.9 || 2.0 || 0.9 || 0.5 || 1.7 || 9.2
|-
| align="left" | 2013
| align="left" | New York*
| 11 || 2 || 19.4 || .348 || .200 || .788 || 3.3 || 1.7 || 0.5 || 0.3 || 1.5 || 6.7
|-
| align="left" | 2013
| align="left" | Total
| 26 || 17 || 23.9 || .398 || .208 || .705 || 4.2 || 1.9 || 0.7 || 0.3 || 1.6 || 8.2
|-
| align="left" | 2014
| align="left" | New York*
| 19 || 2 || 16.8 || .404 || .200 || .714 || 2.5 || 1.1 || 0.4 || 0.3 || 1.1 || 5.7
|-
| align="left" | 2014
| align="left" | Atlanta*
| 2 || 0 || 11.5 || .286 || .500 || 1.000 || 1.0 || 0.0 || 0.5 || 1.5 || 1.5 || 4.5
|-
| align="left" | 2014
| align="left" | Total
| 21 || 2 || 27.2 || .417 || .326 || .823 || 4.2 || 1.8 || 1.0 || 0.7 || 1.8 || 2.1
|-
| align="left" | 2015
| align="left" | Atlanta
| 18 || 1 || 8.9 || .340 || .100 || .556 || 1.8 || 0.4 || 0.1 || 0.7 || 1.7 || 2.1
|-
| align="left" | Career
| align="left" | 17 years, 5 teams
| 499 || 435 || 28.8 || .440 || .325 || .790 || 5.2 || 1.8 || 1.2 || 0.7 || 2.4 || 11.2

Postseason 

|-
| align="left" | 1999
| align="left" | Los Angeles
| 4 || 4 || 31.8 || .450 || .000 || .429 || 5.3 || 2.5 || 1.8 || 1.5 || 1.2 || 9.8
|-
| align="left" | 2000
| align="left" | Los Angeles
| 4 || 4 || 34.0 || .541 || .000 || .833 || 5.5 || 3.0 || 1.5 || 0.5 || 2.5 || 12.5
|-
|style="text-align:left;background:#afe6ba;"|2001†
| align="left" | Los Angeles
| 7 || 7 || 32.3 || .547 || .375 || .684 || 6.3 || 2.9 || 1.0 || 1.4 || 1.5 || 12.3
|-
|style="text-align:left;background:#afe6ba;"|2002†
| align="left" | Los Angeles
| 6 || 3 || 34.0 || .450 || .563 || .938 || 6.8 || 1.3 || 1.7 || 1.5 || 1.8 || 13.0
|-
| align="left" | 2003
| align="left" | Los Angeles
| 9 || 9 || 37.6 || .443 || .556 || .771 || 6.3 || 2.8 || 1.9 || 1.4 || 2.2 || 14.6
|-
| align="left" | 2006
| align="left" | Washington
| 2 || 2 || 34.5 || .379 || .444 || 1.000 || 9.0 || 2.5 || 1.5 || 0.5 || 3.0 || 14.0
|-
| align="left" | 2008
| align="left" | Los Angeles
| 6 || 6 || 34.3 || .407 || .357 || .733 || 6.0 || 1.8 || 1.3 || 0.7 || 2.1 || 10.7
|-
| align="left" | 2009
| align="left" | Los Angeles
| 6 || 6 || 31.7 || .351 || .308 || .625 || 5.8 || 2.5 || 1.7 || 0.2 || 2.1 || 9.0
|-
| align="left" | 2010
| align="left" | Los Angeles
| 2 || 2 || 35.5 || .360 || 1.000 || .500 || 8.5 || 1.0 || 0.5 || 0.5 || 2.5 || 10.5
|-
| align="left" | 2012
| align="left" | Los Angeles
| 4 || 4 || 25.3 || .375 || .500 || .778 || 3.5 || 1.8 || 1.0 || 0.5 || 2.2 || 5.5
|-
| align="left" | Career
| align="left" | 10 years, 2 teams
| 50 || 47 || 33.4 || .440 || .459 || .741 || 6.1 || 2.3 || 1.5 || 1.0 || 2.1 || 11.5

See also 

 List of Florida Gators in the WNBA
 List of multiple Olympic gold medalists
 List of Olympic medalists in basketball
 List of University of Florida alumni
 List of University of Florida Olympians
List of University of Florida Athletic Hall of Fame members

References

External links 
 WNBA player profile of Delisha Milton-Jones
 USA basketball bio of Delisha Milton-Jones
 WNBA mini-interview with Delisha Milton-Jones

1974 births
Living people
African-American basketball coaches
African-American basketball players
All-American college women's basketball players
American Basketball Association (2000–present) coaches
American expatriate basketball people in Spain
American people of Hausa descent
American people of Yoruba descent
American sportspeople of Nigerian descent
American women's basketball coaches
American women's basketball players
Atlanta Dream players
Basketball coaches from Georgia (U.S. state)
Basketball players at the 2000 Summer Olympics
Basketball players at the 2008 Summer Olympics
Basketball players from Georgia (U.S. state)
Florida Gators women's basketball players
Los Angeles Sparks draft picks
Los Angeles Sparks players
Medalists at the 2000 Summer Olympics
Medalists at the 2008 Summer Olympics
New York Liberty players
Old Dominion Monarchs women's basketball coaches
Olympic gold medalists for the United States in basketball
People from Liberty County, Georgia
Pepperdine Waves women's basketball coaches
Portland Power players
San Antonio Stars players
Small forwards
Syracuse Orange women's basketball coaches
Universiade gold medalists for the United States
Universiade medalists in basketball
Washington Mystics players
Women's National Basketball Association All-Stars
Yoruba sportswomen
Medalists at the 1997 Summer Universiade
21st-century African-American sportspeople
21st-century African-American women
20th-century African-American sportspeople
20th-century African-American women
United States women's national basketball team players